Coleophora falcigerella is a moth of the family Coleophoridae. It is found in southern Russia.

The larvae feed on the leaves of Glycyrrhiza glabra.

References

falcigerella
Moths of Europe